Acylita monosticta  is a species of moth of the family Noctuidae first described by E. Dukinfield Jones in 1908. It is found in Brazil. Its wingspan is about 24 mm.

Description
Head and thorax brownish ochreous; pectus white; legs brownish ochreous; abdomen white tinged with ochreous and slightly irrorated (sprinkled) with fuscous. Forewing brownish ochreous faintly tinged with red and very slightly irrorated with brown; a black discoidal point; traces of an oblique diffused red fascia from apex to discocellulars. Hindwing white suffused with ochreous; the underside white, the costal area suffused with ochreous.

References

Hadeninae
Moths of South America